The Estrella–Pantaleon Bridge, also known as the Rockwell Bridge, is a four-lane box girder bridge crossing the Pasig River in Metro Manila, Philippines. It connects Estrella Street in Makati on the south bank of the Pasig River (near the Rockwell Center), to Pantaleon Street via Barangka Drive in Mandaluyong on the north bank, near the site of the Acqua Private Residences.

It is one of three bridges connecting Makati and Mandaluyong, the other two being the Makati–Mandaluyong Bridge connecting Makati Avenue and Poblacion, Makati, to Mandaluyong, and the Guadalupe Bridge carrying EDSA between the two cities, ultimately serving to help relieve chronic traffic congestion on the two other bridges.

History

First bridge

Originally announced in 2003 by the Metropolitan Manila Development Authority (MMDA) as one of several bridges to be built by October that year, construction of the bridge would not be realized until several years later, when it was ultimately made part of the Bridge Construction and Acceleration Project for Calamity Stricken Areas I (BCAPCSA I) program, a three-year program funded by Austria to help the Philippines build nineteen weather-resistant bridges, building on a similar program executed by the Austrian and Philippine governments between 2001 and 2005. The bridge was a  two-lane box truss bridge. Austrian firm Waagner-Biro provided the modular steel components for the bridge, while actual construction work was performed by the Department of Public Works and Highways (DPWH).

The  million bridge was inaugurated on February 12, 2011 by Vice President Jejomar Binay along with the mayors of Makati and Mandaluyong (Jejomar Binay, Jr. and Benjamin Abalos, Jr. respectively), DPWH Secretary Rogelio Singson, and Austrian ambassador to the Philippines Wilhelm Donko. The bridge opened to motorists on the same day.

Second bridge

In June 2017, Department of Public Works and Highways (DPWH) Secretary Mark Villar announced the expansion of the Estrella–Pantaleon Bridge. Funded by China, the new bridge has four lanes and is a  twin spine steel box girder bridge with concrete deck slabs. It will utilize the existing approaches while modifying the abutment and piers to accommodate the new bridge superstructure. The bridge is designed to withstand high-intensity earthquakes. The project is handled by China Road and Bridge Corporation. Aside from the bridge itself, the construction project also includes improving access to the bridge by upgrading and widening Barangka Drive and Pantaleon Street on the Mandaluyong side.

The bridge was briefly closed on September 23, 2018 to give way for preparation of expansion works but was shortly reopened on September 25 due to the anticipated heavy traffic situation due to the Christmas holiday season. Plans for expansion works were moved to January 2019. The closure of the bridge started on January 19, 2019, and was met with controversies, citing capacity constraints on the Mandaluyong side landing in a two-lane street, and the long project duration, originally expected to last for 30 months.

The bridge expansion is part of the Build! Build! Build! Infrastructure Program.

On April 23, 2021, DPWH announced a final concrete pouring and completion of the substructure and superstructure of the second bridge. The bridge was expected to open in June 2021, but was delayed repeatedly due to the COVID-19 pandemic, among other developments.

The newly-expanded  billion bridge was inaugurated on July 29, 2021 by President Rodrigo Duterte. The bridge reopened to vehicles on the same day.

Traffic regulation
In September 2015, Cabinet Secretary Jose Rene Almendras announced that the government was looking into implementing a one-way traffic scheme on the Estrella–Pantaleon and Makati–Mandaluyong Bridges.

See also
List of crossings of the Pasig River

References

Bridges in Metro Manila
Truss bridges
Buildings and structures in Makati
Buildings and structures in Mandaluyong
Bridges completed in 2011